The women's heptathlon event at the 2006 Commonwealth Games was held on March 21–22.

Medalists

Results

100 metres hurdles
Wind:Heat 1: +2.0 m/s, Heat 2: +0.5 m/s

High jump

Shot put

200 metres
Wind:Heat 1: +0.9 m/s, Heat 2: +0.6 m/s

Long jump

Javelin throw

800 metres

Final standings

References
Results

Heptathlon
2006
2006 in women's athletics